John Edwin Addenbrooke (4 January 1900 – 2 October 1961) was a footballer who played in the Football League for Chesterfield. He also played non-league football for Beighton, Frickley Colliery, Wath Athletic, Tinsley Working Mens Club and Fulwood.

References

1900 births
1961 deaths
Footballers from Sheffield
English footballers
Association football forwards
Beighton Miners Welfare F.C. players
Chesterfield F.C. players
Frickley Athletic F.C. players
Wath Athletic F.C. players
English Football League players